The Grand Prix Sven Nys or GP Sven Nys is a cyclo-cross race held in Baal, Belgium. The race is named after cyclo-cross legend Sven Nys who is a citizen of Baal. Nys won his "own" race 12 out of 16 times he competed. He was sick at home for the 14th edition in 2013. The race is part of the X²O Badkamers Trophy.

Podiums

Men

Women

External links
 
 

Cycle races in Belgium
Cyclo-cross races
Recurring sporting events established in 2000
2000 establishments in Belgium
Sport in Flemish Brabant